The Battle of Mashkullorë (March 18, 1908), was one of the most important battles of Çerçiz Topulli against the Turkish occupation

Background 
On February 25, 1908 Çerçiz Topulli and his Albanian rebel group assassinated the Ottoman binbashi of Gjirokastër. After the assassination of the Ottoman binbashi, Çerçiz Topulli and his Albanian rebels fled to Mashkullorë

Armed resistance in Mashkullorë 

On March 18, the Albanian rebels and Çerçiz Topulli were surrounded by Ottoman forces. The Ottoman forces had over 150 soldiers and the Albanian rebels were outnumbered, nevertheless, Çerçiz Topulli was able to fight the soldiers, and emerge victorious.
The Albanian rebel group of the detachment faced for a whole day the relentless attacks of the Turkish forces and were able to break the siege. The Turkish forces lost 20 soldiers including their general. The Albanian rebels, on the other hand, did not lose any soldiers, but Çerçiz Topulli and Myftar Axhemi were wounded.

References 

Albanian National Awakening
Battles involving the Ottoman Empire
1908 in the Ottoman Empire
History of Albania
Gjirokastër